Leucanopsis stipulatoides is a moth of the family Erebidae. It was described by Walter Rothschild in 1910. It is found in Guyana and Venezuela.

References

stipulatoides
Moths described in 1910